Chorismagrion is a monotypic genus of damselflies belonging to the family Synlestidae.
The single species of this genus, Chorismagrion risi,
known as a pretty relict, 
is a slender, medium-sized damselfly, mostly black in colour with white markings.
It is endemic to north-eastern Australia, where it inhabits streams and large pools in rainforests.

See also
 List of Odonata species of Australia

Notes 
Until recently, Chorismagrion was considered to be the only genus in the family Chorismagrionidae.

Gallery

References

Synlestidae
Zygoptera genera
Monotypic Odonata genera
Odonata of Australia
Endemic fauna of Australia
Taxa named by Kenneth J. Morton
Insects described in 1914
Damselflies